Ali ibn Hammud al-Nasir (d. 22 March 1018) was the sixth Caliph of Córdoba from 1016 until his death. He was a member of the Hammudid dynasty of the Al-Andalus.

He was named governor of Ceuta after 1013 by caliph Sulayman ibn al-Hakam. Taking advantage of the anarchy then existing in the reign, he conquered Tangiers, also in Africa, then, after occupying the Iberian port of Algeciras, he moved to Málaga. After also conquering the latter, he moved with his North African army to the capital, Córdoba, capturing it on 1 July 1016. Caliph Suleyman was first imprisoned and then beheaded, when news arrived of the death of the former caliph, Hisham II al-Hakam.

Ali was elected caliph, adopting the title (laqab) of al-Nasir li-din Allah ("Defender of the Religion of God"). Initially the population welcomed him for his impartiality; however, later, both his severity and the appearance of a ruler from the previous ruling dynasty of the Umayyads, Abd ar-Rahman IV, made him unpopular, among with the existence of a complot made against him from the bereber population mostly which he noticed that ended with cruel and aggressive actions ruining his own reign and he was assassinated on 22 March 1018. Abd ar-Rahman was elected caliph, but he was in turn ousted by Ali's brother, al-Qasim al-Ma'mun, governor of Seville.

Sources

1018 deaths
11th-century Arabs
11th-century caliphs of Córdoba
11th-century murdered monarchs
Hammudid caliphs of Córdoba
Assassinated Spanish politicians
Year of birth unknown
Place of birth unknown